Changla Gali is one of the tourist mountain resort towns of the Galyat area of Pakistan. It has an elevation of 2804m. During British rule it was the headquarters of the Northern Command School of Musketry.

Location 
Changla Gali is located in Seer Gharbi which is a Union Council of Abbottabad District, and is located 16 km north from the more famous Galyat town of Murree in Rawalpindi District.

References

Hill stations in Pakistan
Populated places in Abbottabad District
Galyat of Pakistan